These are the official results of the men's 5000 metres at the 1996 Summer Olympics in Atlanta, Georgia. The event took place between 31 July and 3 August.

Medalists

Summary

After a diverse semi-final round where one heat ran a modes 14 minute strategic race and the other ran over thirty seconds faster, some athletes had an easier time of qualifying for the final.

At the gun, the entire Moroccan team went to the front, but then controlled the pace.  After a lap at the back of the pack, Kenyan Tom Nyariki ran around the field to take the lead.  German Dieter Baumann hung on his shoulder as it looked like an early attempt to steal the race with a quick breakaway.  Several others in the field scrambled forward while Nyariki, shadowed by his teammate Shem Kororia pushed the pace, exchanging the lead position and stringing out the field into single file.  American Bob Kennedy marked this action hovering around second place.  With four laps to go, after an exchange of Kenyan leaders, Burundi's Vénuste Niyongabo moved into second place, squeezing back Kennedy into third.  Over the next lap, Nyariki and Moroccan Brahim Lahlafi got past Kennedy.  Just before two laps to go, Kennedy ran around the group and into the lead.  Kennedy led for the first 300 metres of the penultimate lap before Niyongabo passed him coming off the turn, followed by the designated kickers who had protected their interests at the back of the pack;  Paul Bitok (Kenya), Khalid Boulami (Morocco) and Baumann.  But as one of the fastest 1500 meter runners in the world at the time, Niyongabo had the position and more speed, opening up a 5 metre gap on Boulami.  At the beginning of the final turn, Bitok got around Boulami and everybody sprinted for home.  Nobody was able to make any progress except that Niyongabo slowed on the final straight to celebrate Burundi's first gold medal.

Records
These were the standing world and Olympic records (in minutes) prior to the 1996 Summer Olympics.

Results

Heats
Qualification: First 8 in each heat (Q) and the next 6 fastest (q) qualified to the semifinals.

Semifinals
Qualification: First 6 in each heat (Q) and the next 3 fastest (q) qualified to the final.

Final

See also
1994 Men's European Championships 5.000 metres (Helsinki)
1995 Men's World Championships 5.000 metres (Gothenburg)
1997 Men's World Championships 5.000 metres (Athens)
1998 Men's European Championships 5.000 metres (Budapest)

References

External links
 Official Report
 Results

5
5000 metres at the Olympics
Men's events at the 1996 Summer Olympics